Established in March 1998, NPS MedicineWise (known prior to 2009 as the National Prescribing Service) is an Australian not-for-profit organisation whose programs are funded by the national Department of Health. Since July 2012, the organisation has been officially known as NPS MedicineWise.

NPS MedicineWise provides practical tools (such as medicines lists), evidence-based information, and educational activities, with the intention of improving the way health technologies, including how medicines and medical tests, are prescribed and used.

Overview
NPS MedicineWise was founded in 1998 as part of an Australian Government shift in health policy to address issues around Quality Use of Medicines (QUM). NPS MedicineWise' initial mandate was to reduce cost of medicines to Australia's Pharmaceutical Benefits Scheme (PBS) by providing clinically reviewed independent information about medicines to doctors, pharmacists, and other health professionals. Many of these materials relate to new drugs or more complex grey-areas in the prescription process.

Since 2003, NPS MedicineWise has assumed a secondary mandate: promoting discussion of basic medicine-related issues in the community via consumer education programs and major award-winning campaigns, including Be Medicinewise Week, launched in January 2011. The campaign has been broadcast across a wide spectrum of media channels and addressed common health issues such as lower back pain, antibiotics, and the active ingredient of medicines.

Although NPS MedicineWise have brought wide-ranging savings to the Australian health system, critics have questioned the actual causes and ramifications of such savings. However the savings reported by the organisation are comprehensively evaluated and accepted by government, demonstrating a clear correlation between NPS MedicineWise programs and improved prescribing.

Historical success 
In the period between 1998 and 2004, 90% of all GPs were actively involved in one or more educational activities run by NPS MedicineWise, while approximately sixty per cent of GPs and pharmacists rated its printed educational materials as good or very good.

NPS MedicineWise activities have generated substantial financial savings to the PBS, with the organisation claiming that its information and education campaigns have reduced unnecessary prescriptions and improved prescribing decisions within the medical community. Various health professionals argue that, despite potential conflicts between cost-saving and the organisation's Quality Use of Medicines mandate, NPS Medicinewise will continue to improve on the current PBS system.

NPS MedicineWise has also developed programs and resources to help consumers and health practitioners to discuss health issues and improve the QUM within Australia.

Events

National Medicines Symposium (NMS)
NMS is the pre-eminent quality use of medicines symposium held in Australia. Held every two years, the scientific program is designed to provide the latest and the controversial in the medicines and health environment and is delivered by international and nationally acclaimed experts.

References

External links
 
 Australian Prescriber

Medical and health organisations based in Australia
Pharmaceuticals policy